Tiefenthaler is a German-language toponymic surname for someone originating from Tiefenthal. Notable people with the surname include:

 Dominik Tiefenthaler (born 1971), Austrian-German actor
 Gustav Tiefenthaler (1886–1942), Swiss-American wrestler
 Jill Tiefenthaler (born 1965), American professor of economics and president of Colorado College
 Joseph Tiefenthaler (1710–1785), Austrian Jesuit missionary and geographer
 Paulo Tiefenthaler (born 1968), Swiss-Brazilian actor
 Verle Tiefenthaler (born 1937), American Major League Baseball pitcher

See also

References 

German-language surnames